Shlomo Leib Brevda (1931 – January 2013) was an American-born rabbi, inspirational Torah leader and mashpia who authored numerous books. He joined the Mir Yeshiva following its escape from the Holocaust and became a disciple of Rabbi Chatzkel Levenstein, the yeshiva's mashgiach ruchani. In the 1950s he moved to Israel. Much of Shlomo's writing was about musar and the Vilna Gaon, of whom he was a descendant. He was survived by his wife and their "six children, Reb Chaike, Reb Velvel, Reb Aharon, Rachel Altusky, Frume Yasolvsky and Estie Druk."

Works
 Miracles of Chanukah
 The Miracles of Purim

His first work, Ameilus HaTorah, was published anonymously.

References

External links
 , a website dedicated to his works and shiurim

Lectures
Shiurim by Rabbi Brevda:
 Rabbi Shlomo Brevda ztl at TorahAnytime.com
 Harav Shlomo Brevda zt"l at Kol HaLashon

1931 births
2013 deaths
American Haredi rabbis